Jeffrey Kenneth Aronson  (born 1947) is a British clinical pharmacologist.

Aronson studied at the University of Glasgow from 1964 to 1973, and at the Medical Research Council's unit of clinical pharmacology at Oxford.

He was a reader in clinical pharmacology at the University of Oxford, and was an honorary consultant physician for the Oxford Radcliffe Hospitals Trust.

He served as president of the British Pharmacological Society in the 2008 to 2009 period; as vice-chairman of the Medicines Commission from 2002 to 2005; and as editor-in-chief of the British Journal of Clinical Pharmacology from 2003 to 2007. He also served as chair of the British Pharmacopoeia Commission's Expert Advisory Group on Nomenclature from 2006; as a member of the Formulary Committees of the British National Formulary from 2006, and of the British National Formulary for Children from 2003.

He was elected a Fellow of the Royal College of Physicians, an Honorary Fellow of the British Pharmacological Society and an Honorary Fellow of the Faculty of Pharmaceutical Medicine.

References

External links 

 
 

1947 births
Place of birth missing (living people)
Living people
Clinical pharmacologists
Fellows of Green Templeton College, Oxford
Fellows of the Royal College of Physicians